Samuel Loomis (aka Dr. Sam Loomis) is a fictional character in the Halloween film series.

Samuel Loomis may also refer to:

Samuel Loomis (businessman) (1748–1814), American furniture maker
Samuel Lane Loomis (1856–1938), American minister and author
Sam Loomis, a fictional character in the 1960 film Psycho and Season 5 of the television series Bates Motel

See also

 Sam Carpenter, aka Sam Loomis, daughter of Billy Loomis, a fictional character from the 5th Scream film franchise film Scream (2022 film)
Loomis (disambiguation)
Samuel (disambiguation)